Jonathan Reuven Rotem is a South African-American record producer, songwriter and music publisher.

Biography

Early life 
Rotem was born in South Africa to Jewish Israeli immigrant parents. He moved to Canada at the age of two and to Moraga, California at the age of twelve.

Rotem's entry point into music was in receiving classical piano instruction at a young age. When he attended Berklee College of Music in Boston it was initially with the intention of studying film scoring, but he ended up majoring in jazz composition.

Career 
As his first major label placement, the Destiny's Child song "Fancy", from their 2001 album Survivor, is cited by Rotem as being his first 'big break', and the song that convinced the young producer that it was worth pursuing this career path. Nevertheless, further success was not forthcoming and for years Rotem struggled to make further headway in the industry.

A significant breakthrough came when, through mutual friend Evan Bogart, he attracted the attention of former manager Zach Katz, a former music attorney who had recently represented rapper Rakim as well as muslc producers and songwriters in the Aftermath/Shady/G-Unit camp. Rotem says, "One of my biggest goals for years was meeting a manager with a good reputation and with connections to get my music to people." When asked in an interview with HitQuarters what made Katz decide to take the producer on, he explained,

This was a time where most of the people were beat makers, they didn't really play instruments. J.R. on the other hand, had a vast musical background ... So musically there were no limitations as far as what he could bring. Number two J.R. he was very, very focused. He really wanted to win. And number three he was humble. If I gave him any suggestions about his tracks he would literally sit there and take notes. Then he would come back the next day with the changes I had suggested.

Rotem's next major cut was 50 Cent's "Position of Power" in 2005. In 2006, together with Katz and his brother Tommy, Rotem started his own record label, Beluga Heights, inking a joint venture partnership  with Epic. Sean Kingston, a young Miami-based artist, was the labels first signing. Kingston's self-titled debut album went on to sell over 2 million albums and 10 million singles worldwide. Rotem also started a publishing company under the Beluga Heights banner, signing songwriter Evan "Kidd" Bogart. Under a newly formed joint venture with Warner Bros. Records, the label signed R&B sensation Jason Derulo, whose debut album went on to sell 14 million singles and over 1 million albums worldwide.

In 2009, Rotem was honored as BMI Producer of the Year. In 2011, he was return to honored by BMI as Songwriter of the Year alongside Lady Gaga and Jason Derulo. His trademark is a horn that goes after with a stylized "J-J-J-J-J-R" and/or "Beluga Heights" at the start or end of records with which he has been associated.

In 2015, Rotem worked alongside Ne-Yo and Timbaland on the music for Season 2 of Fox's Empire. On October 17, 2015, Gwen Stefani premiered "Used to Love You", co-written and produced by Rotem at the Hammerstein Ballroom in New York City which was Stefani's first single. Rotem has ten songs on Stefani's album, This Is What the Truth Feels Like which was released on March 18, 2016.

Discography

Songs and singles produced by J.R. Rotem

References

External links 
The DJBooth: Jonathan 'JR' Rotem Interview (Mar '07)
SOHH June 2007 Feature
Interview, HitQuarters Apr 2010

Living people
American hip hop record producers
American music industry executives
American music publishers (people)
American people of Israeli descent
American people of South African-Jewish descent
American pop keyboardists
American pop pianists
American male pianists
American rhythm and blues keyboardists
Berklee College of Music alumni
Businesspeople from Los Angeles
Jewish American musicians
Jewish American songwriters
Musicians from Los Angeles
People from Moraga, California
Songwriters from California
South African emigrants to the United States
21st-century American pianists
Record producers from California
21st-century American male musicians
1975 births
21st-century American Jews
American male songwriters